Jean Dubé is the name of:

 Jean-Eudes Dubé (1926–2019), Canadian politician
 Jean F. Dubé (born 1962), Canadian politician and businessman
 Jean Dubé (musician) (born 1981), French pianist